George Milton Roudebush (January 25, 1894 – February 29, 1992) was an American professional football player with the Canton Bulldogs, Cincinnati Celts of the "Ohio League", and the Dayton Triangles of the early National Football League (NFL). He was also a lawyer in Cleveland for 73 years.

Biography

College
George attended Denison University where he earned all-Ohio Conference honors in football. He also lettered in basketball, baseball, and tennis. He graduated in 1915 with a Bachelor of Philosophy degree, followed by a Bachelor of Laws degree from the University of Cincinnati.

Forward pass
While Knute Rockne and Gus Dorais are credited as the first team to develop and use the forward pass,  it upset the heavily favored Army team. The first forward pass was thrown by Roudebush a year earlier in 1912 to Dave Reese in a 3-3 tie against Wooster College and a 60-3 Denison victory over Otterbein College. George later stated that he used his experience of throwing stones and corncobs at hogs and chickens on his family farm to inspire his passing technique.

Prior to 1912, a forward pass could only be thrown 5 yards behind the line of scrimmage and travel no more than 20 yards;  noted by football rules 6 and 12. Denison, under coach Walter Livingston, relied heavily on the pass after the rules were changed to allow the ball travel an unlimited amount of distance and be thrown any distance behind the line of scrimmage. This allowed for teams to easily use the pass. The forward pass was used as far back as 1906 by Peggy Parratt of the Massillon Tigers, however it was used more as a gimmick. Roudebush's use of the pass, changed the way the pass was used. It was now a legitimate football strategy.

World War I
During World War I George served as a captain in the Army. He spent 18 months in France during the war.

Pro football
George started as a pro with the Cincinnati Celts in 1915. He also played for the Canton Bulldogs while Jim Thorpe was away playing baseball in 1916. When Thorpe returned to the team, George returned to playing for the Cincinnati Celts that same year. By this time George was working in a law office in Cleveland throughout the week. By Friday he would jump aboard a train for a weekend football game, taking along his own equipment in a duffel bag. Sometimes, to make the kickoff, he had to change into his football duds on the train. George's two seasons with the Dayton Triangles in 1920 and 1921 made him the oldest living NFL player from 1988 until his death in 1992. He also lined-up for the Triangles against the Columbus Panhandles in what may have been the very first NFL game.

1916 Pine Village game
Probably the greatest moment in the Cincinnati Celts early existence came against a team from Pine Village, Indiana, team 1916. Pine Village consisted of only 300 residents, however it was the top team in Indiana before World War I, compiling a record of undefeated for 13 seasons. In 117 games, they’d only once been tied. Pine Village faced the Celts before a crowd of 2,500 people in Lafayette. With Pine Village leading the Cincinnati 6-2, the Celts forced to punt. Roudebush then lined up behind the punter. Under the rules of the time, anyone lining up behind the punter was eligible to recover the kick as a free ball. After the ball was kicked, Roudebush, ran down the field. Pine Village not wanting to touch the ball, was unaware that Roudebush was eligible to recover it. Roudebush recovered the ball in the Pine Village endzone, giving the Celts a 9-6 victory.

Law practice
Roudebush returned to Ohio in 1919 and began his law practice with Snyder, Henry Thomsen, Ford, & Seagrave. He became a specialist in public finance and taxation. Later he was senior partner in Roudebush, Brown, Corlett & Ulrich which merged with Arter & Hadden in 1986. As chairman of the Chamber of Commerce committee on taxation in the 1930s, he favored repealing the enabling act which allowed cities to vote taxes for relief purposes.

Other sports
Roudebush was coach of the first college basketball team of St. Xavier College (later Xavier University) in 1915–16. Roudebush also played professional basketball in Dayton during the 1920s and officiated college football and baseball games. In 1929 he and Harold Lowe won Cleveland's tennis doubles championship. In 1975, he was inducted into the Denison University Athletic Hall of Fame.

Family
Roudebush lived in the Shaker Heights neighborhood of Cleveland and was the son of George Milton and Rose Patchel Roudebush. On June 28, 1924 he married Harriette McCann in Dayton. The couple had three children, Jane R. Daganhardt, George M. III, and Thomas. George died in Chardon, Ohio in 1992 and was buried at Maple Grove Cemetery located in Licking County, Ohio.

References

Additional sources
 Encyclopedia of Cleveland History: George Roudebush

External links
 
 

1894 births
1992 deaths
American football fullbacks
Canton Bulldogs (Ohio League) players
Cincinnati Celts (Ohio League) players
Dayton Triangles (Ohio League) players
Dayton Triangles players
Denison Big Red baseball players
Denison Big Red football players
Denison Big Red men's basketball players
College men's tennis players in the United States
United States Army officers
United States Army personnel of World War I
University of Cincinnati alumni
Lawyers from Cleveland
Sportspeople from Shaker Heights, Ohio
Players of American football from Ohio
Baseball players from Ohio
Basketball players from Ohio
Military personnel from Ohio
Tennis people from Ohio